Tristan is a 1903 novella by German writer Thomas Mann set in a sanatorium. It contains many references to the myth of Tristan and Iseult. The novella alludes in particular to the version presented in Richard Wagner's opera of the same name.

English translations 

 H. T. Lowe-Porter (1936)
 David Luke (1988)
 Joachim Neugroschel (1998)
 Jefferson S. Chase (1999)

External links
Project Gutenberg's German etext of Tristan
 Court Order to Block Access in Germany

Novellas by Thomas Mann
1903 German-language novels
Novella
Modern Arthurian fiction
Arthurian literature in German
1903 German novels